Brunneria is a genus of praying mantises in family Mantidae. They are often called stick mantis for their slender shape and the species of the genus are native to the Americas.

Taaxonomy and systematics
The following species are recognised in the genus Brunneria:
Brunneria borealis (Brunner's mantis, Brunner's stick mantis)
Brunneria brasiliensis (Brazilian stick mantis)
Brunneria gracilis
Brunneria grandis
Brunneria longa
Brunneria subaptera (small-winged stick mantis)

See also
List of mantis genera and species

References

 
Mantodea genera
Mantidae
Mantodea of North America
Mantodea of South America
Taxa named by Henri Louis Frédéric de Saussure